Flammeovirga aprica is a bacterium from the genus of Flammeovirga which has been isolated from marine mud in Yugoslavia.

References

Further reading 
 
 

Cytophagia
Bacteria described in 1989